The Parliamentary Under-Secretary of State for Europe, formerly the Minister of State for Europe is a ministerial position within the Government of the United Kingdom, in charge of affairs with Europe. The Minister can also be responsible for government policy towards European security; defence and international security; the Falkland Islands; polar regions; migration; protocol; human resources; OSCE and Council of Europe; relations with Parliament; British Overseas Territories of Gibraltar and Sovereign Base Areas in Cyprus; and FCO finance, knowledge and technology.

History
The office currently a Minister of State at the Foreign, Commonwealth and Development Office. Despite being a junior ministerial role, the position has sometimes conferred the right to attend meetings of the Cabinet, which is occasionally granted to other such ministers at the Prime Minister's discretion. This first occurred when Denis MacShane was replaced by Douglas Alexander after the 2005 general election, although Alexander's successor ceased to have this right. When Chris Bryant held the office, it was not as Minister of State but as Parliamentary Under-Secretary of State for Europe and Asia.

The responsibilities of the office were next appointed to a Minister of State in 2010 by then Prime Minister David Cameron. He appointed David Lidington, who held the office for over six years. In July 2016, the responsibility for the relationship with the European Union, which represented the greater part of British policy towards Europe, became the brief of a new Cabinet level post, Secretary of State for Exiting the European Union, or more informally, Brexit Secretary.  With the winding up of DEXEU, the department led by the Brexit Secretary, responsibility was transferred to the Cabinet Office, first under Michael Gove, and then under Lord Frost who was made a member of the Cabinet and held the ministerial position of Minister of State at the Cabinet Office. Through this period, any residual responsibilities for European relations that remained with the Foreign Office were combined with the portfolio of the traditionally more junior Minister of State for Foreign Affairs. The post of Minister of State for Europe and the Americas was held by Alan Duncan until he resigned on 22 July 2019; Duncan was largely regarded as the second most senior-ranking Foreign Office Minister behind the Foreign Secretary. On 25 July 2019, newly elected Prime Minister Boris Johnson appointed Conservative MP for Tamworth, Christopher Pincher to the role as part of his ministerial reshuffle. Johnson promoted Wendy Morton to the role of Parliamentary Under-Secretary of State for European Neighbourhood and the Americas to replace Pincher in February 2020. In December 2021, upon the resignation of Lord Frost, ministerial responsibility returned to the Foreign Secretary Liz Truss and Chris Heaton-Harris became Minister of State for Europe as responsibility for the United Kingdom's relations with the European Union was moved from the Cabinet Office back to the Foreign Office. In February 2022, James Cleverly was appointed Minister of State for Europe and North America. His former position as Minister of State for Middle East, North Africa and North America was the second highest position in the Foreign Office; his new position as Europe Minister then took its place as the deputy to the Foreign Secretary.

The post is not to be confused with the Minister of State within the Department for Exiting the European Union, the department created by Prime Minister Theresa May following the UK's vote to leave the EU in 2016 and abolished by Boris Johnson following the UK's exit from the EU on 31 January 2020. They supported the work of the department overseeing the UK's exit from the EU rather than overseeing government policy towards all-European affairs.

List of ministers

References

See also
 Foreign and Commonwealth Office
 Minister of State for European Affairs, the counterpart in the Republic of Ireland

Foreign ministers of the United Kingdom
United Kingdom and the European Union
Ministers and ministries responsible for European affairs
Lists of government ministers of the United Kingdom
Ministerial offices in the United Kingdom
1979 establishments in the United Kingdom